Finn Morten Stordalen (born 5 October 1968) is a Norwegian politician for the Progress Party.

He served as a deputy representative to the Parliament of Norway from Vestfold during the terms 2005–2009 and 2009–2013.

On the local level, he is a former deputy mayor of Re.

References

1968 births
Living people
People from Re, Norway
Deputy members of the Storting
Progress Party (Norway) politicians
Vestfold politicians
21st-century Norwegian politicians